Admiral Sir Charles Hamilton, 2nd Baronet KCB (25 May 1767 – 14 September 1849), was a British naval officer and commodore-governor of Newfoundland.

Life
Hamilton was born the eldest son of John Hamilton, a captain in the Royal Navy who had distinguished himself at the Battle of Quebec in 1775. Charles began his naval career at the age of nine on his father's ship, Hector. He attended the Royal Naval Academy at Portsmouth from 1777 to 1779.

He commanded a number of vessels in the Royal Navy and was also a member of the British parliament several times between 1790 and 1812 while still serving in the Royal Navy. He became the 2nd baronet Hamililton of Trebinshun on his father's death in 1784.

From 1818 to 1823 he served as resident governor for the colony of Newfoundland. During this period, he oversaw the reconstruction of St. John's following fires in 1818 and 1819. Although he was charged with promoting agriculture, he was soon discouraged by the poor soils of the island. The economy of the island was depressed due to decreased demand for Newfoundland cod and Hamilton encouraged diversification of the fisheries to include whales, seals and salmon.

Hamilton was promoted to admiral on 22 July 1830, and was awarded KCB in 1833.

He died at the family home at Iping, West Sussex in 1849. He had married Henrietta Martha, the daughter of George Drummond, a banker of Stanmore, Middlesex. Their only son, Sir Charles John James Hamilton, 3rd Baronet, also became an Army officer. Lady Hamilton painted a well-known portrait of Demasduwit, also called Mary March, a Beothuk woman captured in 1818.

Legacy
Hamilton is the namesake of Hamilton Inlet and, formerly, of the Hamilton River (now the Churchill River), both in Labrador.

See also
 Governors of Newfoundland
 List of people of Newfoundland and Labrador

References

Sources

External links 
Biography at Government House The Governorship of Newfoundland and Labrador

1767 births
1849 deaths
Baronets in the Baronetage of Great Britain
Members of the Parliament of Great Britain for constituencies in Cornwall
Members of the Parliament of the United Kingdom for County Tyrone constituencies (1801–1922)
Governors of Newfoundland Colony
Royal Navy admirals
UK MPs 1801–1802
UK MPs 1802–1806
UK MPs 1807–1812
Members of the Parliament of the United Kingdom for Honiton
Knights Commander of the Order of the Bath